Fred Herman Hildebrandt (August 2, 1874 – January 26, 1956) was a member of the United States House of Representatives from South Dakota, serving three consecutive terms. He worked for the railroad for nearly three decades and was appointed as head of the South Dakota Game and Fish Commission, serving from 1927 to 1931.

Early life and education
Hildebrandt was born in West Bend, Wisconsin in 1874. He moved with his parents to Waupun, Wisconsin, where he attended the public and high schools.

Career
He later moved to Watertown, South Dakota in 1900. He started working for the Chicago and Northwestern Railroad and made that his career, from 1903 to 1932.

Political career
He was elected to the South Dakota House of Representatives, serving from 1922 to 1923. He was appointed as head of the South Dakota Game and Fish Commission, serving from 1927 to 1931.

In 1932, Hildebrandt was elected as a Democrat to the United States House of Representatives; he was elected to two more terms, serving through 1938. In 1938, he ran unsuccessfully for the position of United States Senator, but lost to former Governor Tom Berry in the Democratic primary.

After his defeat, Hildebrandt retired from public life and resided in Watertown. He died in Bradenton, Florida in 1956, and was buried at Mount Hope Cemetery, Watertown.

Sources

1874 births
1956 deaths
People from West Bend, Wisconsin
Democratic Party members of the United States House of Representatives from South Dakota
Democratic Party members of the South Dakota House of Representatives
People from Watertown, South Dakota

Members of the United States House of Representatives from South Dakota